Charles Hall (born 13 November 1979) is a British racing driver from Sheffield, England.

After beginning racing in karts, he moved to car racing in 1997 at age 18 in BARC Formula Renault and the Formula Vauxhall Winter Series. He finished second in the main championship of Formula Vauxhall the following year in 1998. In 1999 he drove in the British Formula Three Championship B-class and finished 5th in the Formula Vauxhall Europa Cup. In 2000 he competed in British Formula Renault and finished 6th with one victory at Silverstone Circuit. After starting 2001 in Formula Renault 2000 UK, he moved to the United States mid year to compete in Toyota Atlantic. In 2002 he competed in several different series. In 2003 he captured the Fran-Am 2000 winter series championship in the United States and drove in assorted other races in Europe. In 2005 he was scheduled to drive in GP2 but was injured in a road crash. He returned to racing in 2006 and appeared in 3 Champ Car Atlantic Series races. In 2008 he continued racing in America in the Star Mazda Series for Andersen Racing and was slated to make his Indy Lights debut in July at Watkins Glen International driving for the same team but he did not appear on track. He has not appeared in a professional auto race since 2008.

Star Mazda Championship

References

External links
 CharlesHallUSA.com

1979 births
English racing drivers
British Formula Renault 2.0 drivers
Formula Renault Eurocup drivers
North American Formula Renault drivers
Formula Renault V6 Eurocup drivers
Indy Pro 2000 Championship drivers
Living people